Sardar Gurbachan Singh (  (Gurmukhi); 1911–1986) was a Sikh scholar, professor, and author. He was born in Moonak, Sangrur district. He was a lecturer at the Sikh National College at Lahore. At the Banaras Hindu University he held the Guru Nanak Chair of Sikh Studies. He received the Padma Bhushan in 1985. He received in 1985 the National fellowship by the Indian Council of Historical Research, New Delhi.

Bibliography 
The idea of Sikh State ( 1946)
Anapachhate Rah (1952)
Adhunik Punjabi Sahit (Punjabi Kav) (1955)
Pavittar Jivan Kathavan (1971)
Baba Shaikh Farid (1975)
Muslim League Attack on the Sikhs and Hindus in Punjab, 1947 (1950) It was first published in 1950 by the Shiromani Gurdwara Prabandhak Committee (SGPC). This book details the witness accounts of the Hindus and Sikhs who fled their homes in the West Punjab, the North-West Frontier Province, Sindh and parts of Jammu & Kashmir. 
The Impact of Guru Gobind Singh on Indian Society (1966),
Guru Nanak: His Personality and Vision (1969)
Bhai Vir Singh: Life, Times and Works (1973)
Baba Sheikh Farid (1974)
Guru Tegh Bahadur: Background and Supreme Sacrifice (1976) 
Japuji: The immortal Prayer-chant (1977); and his classical 
Translation in English of the Guru Granth Sahib (Four Volumes)

References 

Encyclopedia of Sikhism by Harbans Singh ji. Published by Punjabi university, Patiala

External links 

1911 births
1986 deaths
20th-century Indian biographers
Recipients of the Padma Bhushan in literature & education
Sikh writers
Religious studies scholars
Scholars of Sikhism
Indian religious writers
Writers from Punjab, India